The Cathedral High School in Bangalore, Karnataka is a co-educational institute affiliated to the Council for the Indian School Certificate Examinations (CISCE). It forms a part of Institutions in the city that are run by the Church of South India under Karnataka Central Diocese. It was established at 1866 and is one of the oldest educational institutions in State being over 150 years since establishment. It is located in Central Business District of the city on Richmond road. The Institution is located on one  campus, it shares the block with CSI-KCD All Saints Church. It also houses the Cathedral Pre-university College in the same campus.

References

Church of South India schools
Christian schools in Karnataka
Primary schools in Karnataka
High schools and secondary schools in Bangalore
Educational institutions established in 1866
1866 establishments in India